Kenneth Augustine Leahy (22 September 1906 — 27 January 1985) was an Australian rules footballer who played with Geelong in the Victorian Football League (VFL).

Leahy, a Western Australian, started his career with West Perth but was at Goldfields club Kalgoorlie Railways when cleared to Geelong in 1925. He was on a half back flank in Geelong's 1925 premiership team.

References

External links
 
 

1906 births
Australian rules footballers from Western Australia
Geelong Football Club players
Geelong Football Club Premiership players
West Perth Football Club players
Kalgoorlie Railways Football Club players
1985 deaths
One-time VFL/AFL Premiership players
People from Kalgoorlie